Ozard Martin du Toit (born 27 June 1989) is a South African professional rugby union player for Spanish División de Honor de Rugby side El Salvador. He is a utility back that can play as a fly-half, fullback or inside centre.

Career

Youth, Amateur and Varsity rugby

Du Toit played high school rugby for Hottentots Holland High School, playing for the first XV since age 16 and making in excess of 50 appearances for his school.

Du Toit joined  in 2008, where he played for the  side during the 2008 Under-19 Provincial Championship and for the  side during the 2009 and 2010 Under-19 Provincial Championships.

Du Toit spent 2011 playing club rugby for Hamiltons in the Western Province Super League before joining the  prior to the 2012 Varsity Cup. He started all seven of the Madibaz' matches, scoring one try and kicking four conversions.

SWD Eagles

Du Toit joined George-based side  for the 2012 Currie Cup First Division season.

In his first full season in 2013, he quickly established himself as a regular for the side. Seven appearances followed in the 2013 Vodacom Cup competition – which included Du Toit's first senior try in their final match of the competition against the  – and he started eleven of his side's fifteen matches during the 2013 Currie Cup First Division, scoring three tries.

Du Toit was shifted to inside centre for the 2014 Vodacom Cup competition, contributing one try as he helped his side to the quarter-finals and was again named in the squad for their 2014 Currie Cup qualification campaign.

References

1989 births
Living people
Eastern Province Elephants players
Hamilton RFC, Sea Point players
Rugby union centres
Rugby union fly-halves
Rugby union fullbacks
Rugby union players from Welkom
South African rugby union players
Southern Kings players
SWD Eagles players